Republicans for National Renewal is an American political advocacy group and 501(c)(4) organization. A right-wing to far right group, members describes themselves as national-populists.

History
The 501(c)(4) organization, Republicans for National Renewal, was founded February 2020. The organization's launch party featured guests such as Corey Stewart, Paul Gosar, and then Brazilian President Eduardo Bolsonaro. Some journalists were ejected from the event. One journalist, who attended the event undercover, described the group as "a new group of far-right activists pushing the Republican Party to embrace national populism." The group has been described as being "Pro-Trump" and "Trump friendly." Gazeta do Povo described the organization as "an arm of the Republican Party". The organization advocates for religious and family values, and is considered to be generally conservative.

In October 2020, Isabella DeLuca, the Outreach Director for Republicans for National Renewal, was assaulted during a protest in Washington, D.C.

In December 2021, the group's Christmas party was attended by Gosar, Louie Gohmert, Matt Gaetz, Mike Collins, Kari Lake, Blake Masters, Wendy Rogers, Mark Finchem, Anthony Sabatini, Anthony Kern, James O'Keefe and Jack Posobiec.

In March 2022, the organization planned a daylong event in Lansing, Michigan, but a portion of the event slated to take place at a local brewery was canceled following online backlash and public pressure.

In April 2022, the organization received a letter of support from Hungarian Prime Minister Viktor Orbán, pledging to strengthen cooperation between the group and Orbán's Fidesz party. The group attended CPAC Hungary in May 2022.

The group has endorsed a multitude of political candidates in the 2022 United States elections.

Leadership
The organization is chaired by Kerry Bentivolio, who served as the congressman representing Michigan's 11th congressional district from 2013 to 2015. Mark Ivanyo is the organization's executive director.

References 

Organizations established in 2020
Political advocacy groups in the United States
501(c)(4) nonprofit organizations
Conservative organizations in the United States